The Former Residence of Xu Guangda or Xu Guangda's Former Residence was built in the late Qing Dynasty in Huangxing Town, Changsha County, Hunan, China where a People's Liberation Army general who was conferred the Da jiang (Grand General) rank, Xu Guangda, was born. It is currently a significant tourist attraction in Changsha.

History
The residence was built in the 34th Year of Emperor Guangxu (1908) in the Qing Dynasty with 14 rooms. On 19 November 1908, Xu Guangda was born in its front room. In 1954, a catastrophic flood destroyed some houses. In March 2005, when Vice-President Zeng Qinghong inspected Changsha County, he gave an order to renovate the residence. In 2011, it was listed as a provincial culture and relics site in Hunan by the Hunan Provincial Government.

Architecture

Rangxian Stele

Access
The Former Residence of Xu Guangda open to visitors for free.

Nearby attractions include the Former Residence of Huang Xing and the Tomb of Zuo Zongtang.

Transportation
 Take bus No. 220 to Former Residence of Guangda Bus Stop.

Gallery

References

External links

Buildings and structures in Changsha
Traditional folk houses in Hunan
1908 establishments in China
Tourist attractions in Changsha
Changsha County
Historical and Cultural Sites Protected at the Provincial Level in Hunan